In mathematics, the hyperoperation sequence  is an infinite sequence of arithmetic operations (called hyperoperations in this context) that starts with a unary operation (the successor function with n = 0). The sequence continues with the binary operations of addition (n = 1), multiplication (n = 2), and exponentiation (n = 3).

After that, the sequence proceeds with further binary operations extending beyond exponentiation, using right-associativity.  For the operations beyond exponentiation, the nth member of this sequence is named by Reuben Goodstein after the Greek prefix of n suffixed with -ation (such as tetration (n = 4), pentation (n = 5), hexation (n = 6), etc.)  and can be written as using n − 2 arrows in Knuth's up-arrow notation.
Each hyperoperation may be understood recursively in terms of the previous one by:

It may also be defined according to the recursion rule part of the definition, as in Knuth's up-arrow version of the Ackermann function:

This can be used to easily show numbers much larger than those which scientific notation can, such as Skewes's number and googolplexplex (e.g.  is much larger than Skewes's number and googolplexplex), but there are some numbers which even they cannot easily show, such as Graham's number and TREE(3).

This recursion rule is common to many variants of hyperoperations.

Definition

Definition, most common 
The hyperoperation sequence  is the sequence of binary operations , defined recursively as follows:

(Note that for n = 0, the binary operation essentially reduces to a unary operation (successor function) by ignoring the first argument.)

For n = 0, 1, 2, 3, this definition reproduces the basic arithmetic operations of successor (which is a unary operation), addition, multiplication, and exponentiation, respectively, as

The  operations for n ≥ 3 can be written in Knuth's up-arrow notation.

So what will be the next operation after exponentiation? We defined multiplication so that  and defined exponentiation so that  so it seems logical to define the next operation, tetration, so that  with a tower of three 'a'. Analogously, the pentation of (a, 3) will be tetration(a, tetration(a, a)), with three "a" in it.

Knuth's notation could be extended to negative indices ≥ −2 in such a way as to agree with the entire hyperoperation sequence, except for the lag in the indexing:

The hyperoperations can thus be seen as an answer to the question "what's next" in the sequence: successor, addition, multiplication, exponentiation, and so on. Noting that

the relationship between basic arithmetic operations is illustrated, allowing the higher operations to be defined naturally as above.

In common terms, the hyperoperations are ways of compounding numbers that increase in growth based on the iteration of the previous hyperoperation. The concepts of successor, addition, multiplication and exponentiation are all hyperoperations; the successor operation (producing x + 1 from x) is the most primitive, the addition operator specifies the number of times 1 is to be added to itself to produce a final value, multiplication specifies the number of times a number is to be added to itself, and exponentiation refers to the number of times a number is to be multiplied by itself.

Definition, using iteration 
Define iteration of a function  of two variables as

The hyperoperation sequence can be defined in terms of iteration, as follows.  For all integers  define

As iteration is associative, the last line can be replaced by

Computation
The definitions of the hyperoperation sequence can naturally be transposed to term rewriting systems (TRS).

TRS based on definition sub 1.1
The basic definition of the hyperoperation sequence corresponds with the reduction rules

To compute  one can use a stack, which initially contains the elements .

Then, repeatedly until no longer possible, three elements are popped and replaced according to the rules

Schematically, starting from :

 WHILE stackLength <> 1
 {
    POP 3 elements;
    PUSH 1 or 5 elements according to the rules r1, r2, r3, r4, r5;
 }

Example

Compute .

The reduction sequence is

When implemented using a stack, on input

TRS based on definition sub 1.2
The definition using iteration leads to a different set of reduction rules

As iteration is associative, instead of rule r11 one can define

Like in the previous section the computation of  can be implemented using a stack.

Initially the stack contains the four elements .

Then, until termination, four elements are popped and replaced according to the rules

Schematically, starting from :
 WHILE stackLength <> 1
 {
    POP 4 elements;
    PUSH 1 or 7 elements according to the rules r6, r7, r8, r9, r10, r11;
 }

Example

Compute .

On input  the successive stack configurations are

The corresponding equalities are

When reduction rule r11 is replaced by rule r12, the stack is transformed acoording to

The successive stack configurations will then be

The corresponding equalities are 

Remarks
 is a special case. See below.
The computation of  according to the rules {r6 - r10, r11} is heavily recursive. The culprit is the order in which iteration is executed: . The first  disappears only after the whole sequence is unfolded. For instance,  converges  to 65536 in 2863311767 steps, the maximum depth of recursion is 65534.
The computation according to the rules {r6 - r10, r12} is more efficient in that respect. The implementation of iteration  as  mimics the repeated execution of a procedure H. The depth of recursion, (n+1), matches the loop nesting.  formalized this correspondence. The computation of  according to the rules {r6-r10, r12} also needs 2863311767 steps to converge on 65536, but the maximum depth of recursion is only 5, as tetration is the 5th operator in the hyperoperation sequence.
The considerations above concern the recursion depth only. Either way of iterating leads to the same number of reduction steps, involving the same rules (when the rules r11 and r12 are considered "the same"). As the example shows the reduction of  converges in 9 steps: 1 X r7, 3 X r8, 1 X r9, 2 X r10, 2 X r11/r12. The modus iterandi only affects the order in which the reduction rules are applied.

Examples 

Below is a list of the first seven (0th to 6th) hyperoperations (0⁰ is defined as 1).

Special cases

Hn(0, b) =
b + 1, when n = 0
b, when n = 1
0, when n = 2
1, when n = 3 and b = 0 
0, when n = 3 and b > 0 
1, when n > 3 and b is even (including 0)
0, when n > 3 and b is odd

Hn(1, b) =
b, when n = 2
1, when n ≥ 3

Hn(a, 0) =
0, when n = 2
1, when n = 0, or n ≥ 3
a, when n = 1

Hn(a, 1) =
a, when  n ≥ 2

Hn(a, a) =
Hn+1(a, 2), when  n ≥ 1

Hn(a, −1) =
0, when n = 0, or n ≥ 4
a − 1, when n = 1
−a, when n = 2
 , when n = 3

Hn(2, 2) =
 3, when n = 0
 4, when n ≥ 1, easily demonstrable recursively.

History 

One of the earliest discussions of hyperoperations was that of Albert Bennett  in 1914, who developed some of the theory of commutative hyperoperations (see below). About 12 years later, Wilhelm Ackermann defined the function   which somewhat resembles the hyperoperation sequence.

In his 1947 paper, Reuben Goodstein introduced the specific sequence of operations that are now called hyperoperations, and also suggested the Greek names tetration, pentation, etc., for the extended operations beyond exponentiation (because they correspond to the indices 4, 5, etc.).   As a three-argument function, e.g., the hyperoperation sequence as a whole is seen to be a version of the original Ackermann function  — recursive but not primitive recursive — as modified by Goodstein to incorporate the primitive successor function together with the other three basic operations of arithmetic (addition, multiplication, exponentiation), and to make a more seamless extension of these beyond exponentiation.

The original three-argument Ackermann function  uses the same recursion rule as does Goodstein's version of it (i.e., the hyperoperation sequence), but differs from it in two ways. First,  defines a sequence of operations starting from addition (n = 0) rather than the successor function, then multiplication (n = 1), exponentiation (n = 2), etc. (See the Ackermann function article for details.)

Notations 

This is a list of notations that have been used for hyperoperations.

Variant starting from a 

In 1928, Wilhelm Ackermann defined a 3-argument function  which gradually evolved into a 2-argument function known as the Ackermann function. Also he assigned addition to n = 0, multiplication to n = 1 and exponentiation to n = 2, so the initial conditions produce very different operations for tetration and beyond.

Variant starting from 0 
In 1984, C. W. Clenshaw and F. W. J. Olver began the discussion of using hyperoperations to prevent computer floating-point overflows.
Since then, many other authors  have renewed interest in the application of hyperoperations to floating-point representation. (Since Hn(a, b) are all defined for b = -1.) While discussing tetration, Clenshaw et al. assumed the initial condition , which makes yet another hyperoperation hierarchy. Just like in the previous variant, the fourth operation is very similar to tetration, but offset by one.

Lower hyperoperations 
An alternative for these hyperoperations is obtained by evaluation from left to right. Since

define (with ° or subscript)

with

This was extended to ordinal numbers by Doner and Tarski, by :

It follows from Definition 1(i), Corollary 2(ii), and Theorem 9, that, for a ≥ 2 and b ≥ 1, that 

But this suffers a kind of collapse, failing to form the "power tower" traditionally expected of hyperoperators:

If α ≥ 2 and γ ≥ 2,[Corollary 33(i)]

Commutative hyperoperations 

Commutative hyperoperations were considered by Albert Bennett as early as 1914, which is possibly the earliest remark about any hyperoperation sequence. Commutative hyperoperations are defined by the recursion rule

which is symmetric in a and b, meaning all hyperoperations are commutative. This sequence does not contain exponentiation, and so does not form a hyperoperation hierarchy.

Numeration systems based on the hyperoperation sequence

R. L. Goodstein  used the sequence of hyperoperators to create systems of numeration for the nonnegative integers.  The so-called complete hereditary representation of integer n, at level k and base b, can be expressed as follows using only the first k hyperoperators and using as digits only 0, 1, ..., b − 1, together with the base b itself:

 For 0 ≤ n ≤ b − 1, n is represented simply by the corresponding digit.
 For n > b − 1, the representation of n is found recursively, first representing n in the form 
b [k] xk [k − 1] xk − 1 [k - 2] ... [2] x2 [1] x1
where xk, ..., x1 are the largest integers satisfying (in turn)

b [k] xk ≤ n

b [k] xk [k − 1] xk − 1 ≤ n

...

b [k] xk [k − 1] xk − 1 [k - 2] ... [2] x2 [1] x1 ≤ n

Any xi exceeding b − 1 is then re-expressed in the same manner, and so on, repeating this procedure until the resulting form contains only the digits 0, 1, ..., b − 1, together with the base b. 
 
Unnecessary parentheses can be avoided by giving higher-level operators higher precedence in the order of evaluation; thus,

 level-1 representations have the form b [1] X, with X also of this form;

 level-2 representations have the form b [2] X [1] Y, with X,Y also of this form;

 level-3 representations have the form b [3] X [2] Y [1] Z, with X,Y,Z also of this form;

 level-4 representations have the form b [4] X [3] Y [2] Z [1] W, with X,Y,Z,W also of this form;

and so on.

In this type of base-b hereditary representation, the base itself appears in the expressions, as well as "digits" from the set {0, 1, ..., b − 1}. This compares to ordinary base-2 representation when the latter is written out in terms of the base b; e.g., in ordinary base-2 notation, 6 = (110)2 = 2 [3] 2 [2] 1 [1] 2 [3] 1 [2] 1 [1] 2 [3] 0 [2] 0, whereas the level-3 base-2 hereditary representation is 6 = 2 [3] (2 [3] 1 [2] 1 [1] 0) [2] 1 [1] (2 [3] 1 [2] 1 [1] 0). The hereditary representations can be abbreviated by omitting any instances of [1] 0, [2] 1, [3] 1, [4] 1, etc.;  for example, the above level-3 base-2 representation of 6 abbreviates to 2 [3] 2 [1] 2.

Examples:
The unique base-2 representations of the number 266, at levels 1, 2, 3, 4, and 5 are as follows:

Level 1: 266 = 2 [1] 2 [1] 2 [1] ... [1] 2 (with 133 2s)
Level 2: 266 = 2 [2] (2 [2] (2 [2] (2 [2] 2 [2] 2 [2] 2 [2] 2 [1] 1)) [1] 1)
Level 3: 266 = 2 [3] 2 [3] (2 [1] 1) [1] 2 [3] (2 [1] 1) [1] 2
Level 4: 266 = 2 [4] (2 [1] 1) [3] 2 [1] 2 [4] 2 [2] 2 [1] 2
Level 5: 266 = 2 [5] 2 [4] 2 [1] 2 [5] 2 [2] 2 [1] 2

See also

 Large numbers

Notes

References

Bibliography 

 

 

Operations on numbers
Large numbers
1914 introductions